Exergonix Inc, is an energy storage company based in Kansas City, Missouri. It was founded in 2010, after spinning out of Kokam America, Inc., which was acquired by Dow Chemical Company in 2009. Exergonix develops grid energy storage to supply peak-shaving, demand-management, and smart grid capabilities to the grid and micro-grid.

The company designs and builds renewable energy solutions for a wide range of applications including storage for solar and wind power, utility management, the military, telecommunications cell towers and emergency back-up.

Background

History
According to the company president’s statement to the United States Senate Committee on Commerce, Science, and Transportation in 2012, the company’s mission is to make renewable energy cost effective and will allow nations around the world to implement a worldwide, workable, smart and decentralized utility grid. The company makes a “promising energy storage application”.

The facility sits atop 83 acres of land on Missouri Route 291 and U.S. Route 50, previously owned by Pfizer, Inc. Valued at $90 million, the company raised another $2 million from local angel investor group, and a $1.4 million package from the City of Lee’s Summit, Missouri Also from Senators Kit Bond and Jim Talent, the company further secured $8 million in federal funding from a defense spending bill, to bring a new manufacturing plant to Missouri. In 2011, the "Green Energy Park" was dialed back to $50 million, after $100 million federal money fell through.
The CEO had approached state legislators to seek $650 million for a manufacturing plant in the same area.

Funding
The CEO approached the United States Department of Defense with new battery technology and although the agency was interested, its budget was committed. Senator Kit Bond was then approached with the request to include the money in the department's budget.

Nissanka said: "I would say that the reason we got the money has nothing to do with a high-power lobbyist, we got it because of our technology. Earmarks unfortunately are the only way you can drive new technology into the market." Nissanka provided testimony during Senator Roy Blunt’s attempt at Revitalize American Manufacturing and Innovation Act of 2013.

Exergonix received $2 million to build and install a 1 megawatt utility storage at Whiteman Air Force Base in Knob Noster, Missouri in order to demonstrate the ability of the US military to provide safe and effective energy security solutions compounded with renewable energy. The battery technology offered an improved cycle life, lighter weight, wider operating temperature range and true maintenance-free design. Applications include many aerospace and defense uses, such as weapon platforms, aircraft and future land warrior programs.

Energy storage projects
In 2010, as part of Emanuel Cleaver’s Green Impact Zone in Kansas City, Exergonix along with Siemens, Electric Power Research Institute, Landis+Gyr, Intergraph, Tendril, City of Kansas City and the Mid-America Regional Council launched a pilot project for SmartGrid development under Office of Electricity Delivery and Energy Reliability with funding from American Recovery and Reinvestment Act of 2009 in partnership with Kansas City Power and Light. The project aimed to generate greater energy efficiency, reduced cost, improved reliability, more transparent and interactive information, and an improved environmental footprint.

President Barack Obama expressed bright futures talking to Smith Electric Vehicles’s USA branch about clean technology jobs, where Kokam America was the battery supplier, and CEO Don Nissanka (also formerly Kokam America President and CEO) was on the board. Besides Smith Electric, Nissanka had customers in the EV market, but he declined to disclose any of their names. He was also on the 18-member taskforce on Automotive Jobs Task Force, appointed by Governor Jay Nixon in 2009.

"The future is here for us in terms of the battery technology," said Nissanka

Nissanka also initiated the “Missouri Innovation Campus” (MIC) which was Obama’s travel stop for a speech at University of Central Missouri.

“I think the president is right on, I think the administration has done a good job of putting enough money into this economy right now. We’re in a depression and we needed this money to fuel the economy and fuel the jobs. I see it happening. It’s happening around the country”.

According to InformationWeek, the company along with a handful of other battery storage firms, shares Tesla’s ambition of disruptive home power consumption.

In May 2016, the company acquired Coda Energy.

See also
Enphase Energy

References

External links
Official Website
Exergonix Inc at Bloomberg Businessweek
Lobbying activities of Exergonix at OpenSecrets
Campaign finances by the company
CEO Full Testimony at United States Senate Commerce Subcommittee on Competitiveness, Innovation, and Export Promotion
Exergonix: Technology & Investment Showcase at 3rd Annual Storage Week, Infocast
SmartGrid brief Kansas City at SmartGrid.org

Energy storage
Renewable resource companies established in 2010
Energy companies established in 2010
Companies based in Kansas City, Missouri
American companies established in 2010
2010 establishments in Missouri